Johan Teng (forenames also Johannes, Juhan or Ivan; surname variant Volin or Voolin; 20 August 1895 Viljandi County – 28 December 1979 Tallinn) was an Estonian politician. He was a member of I Riigikogu. He was a member of the Riigikogu since 5 May 1922. He replaced Karl Tammik. On 29 September 1922, he was removed from his position and he was replaced by Aleksander Jaakson.

References

1895 births
1979 deaths
Members of the Riigikogu, 1920–1923